The 2016 Aegon Eastbourne Trophy was a professional tennis tournament played on outdoor grass courts. It was the second edition of the tournament and part of the 2016 ITF Women's Circuit, offering a total of $50,000 in prize money. It took place in Eastbourne, United Kingdom, on 30 May–5 June 2016.

Singles main draw entrants

Seeds 

 1 Rankings as of 23 May 2016.

Other entrants 
The following player received a wildcard into the singles main draw:
  Katy Dunne
  Tara Moore
  Laura Robson
  Lisa Whybourn

The following players received entry from the qualifying draw:
  Naiktha Bains
  Ashleigh Barty
  Sanaz Marand
  Storm Sanders

The following player received entry by a lucky loser spot:
  Alison Bai

The following players received entry by protected rankings:
  Michelle Larcher de Brito
  Melanie Oudin

Champions

Singles

 Alison Riske def.  Tara Moore, 4–6, 7–6(7–5), 6–3

Doubles

 Yang Zhaoxuan /  Zhang Kailin def.  Asia Muhammad /  Maria Sanchez, 7–6(7–1), 6–1

External links 
 2016 Aegon Eastbourne Trophy at ITFtennis.com
 Official website

2016 ITF Women's Circuit
2016 in English tennis
May 2016 sports events in the United Kingdom
June 2016 sports events in the United Kingdom
Tennis tournaments in England